is a Japanese professional footballer who plays as a goalkeeper for  club Kashima Antlers.

Club career
Hayakawa made his professional debut in a 8–1 Emperor's Cup win against YSCC Yokohama. He made his J1 League debut in the 2022 season, in a 1–1 draw with Sagan Tosu.

Career statistics

Club
.

References

External links

Profile at Kashima Antlers

1999 births
Living people
Association football people from Kanagawa Prefecture
Meiji University alumni
Japanese footballers
Association football goalkeepers
Yokohama F. Marinos players
Kashima Antlers players